Brian Collins (born 13 May 1948 in Edinburgh, Scotland) is a former motorcycle speedway rider.

Career
Collins spent the first four years of his British speedway career with Edinburgh Monarchs from 1966 to 1969, although they were known as Coatbridge from 1968 to 1969. In 1968, he top scored for Scotland against England in a test match.

In 1970 and 1971, he rode for Wembley after the London team bought the Coatbridge licence before moving on to Poole Pirates for two years. He joined the Coatbridge/Glasgow Tigers in 1974 and won the Scottish Open Champion in 1975.

Also in 1975, Collins finished runner up in the 1975 The National League Riders Championship at Wimbledon. After two unbeaten rides, Collins came out against the only other unbeaten rider Paul Gachet. In their third heat, both Collins and Gachet were cut up before the first bend, Gachet's wheel being struck and, in holding his machine steady, the young Eagle found himself at the back. As he managed to pass Collins, his bike reared on the notorious second bend of Plough Lane and both he and Collins fell. Gachet was carried off and, in the re-run, Collins scored 3 points. Collins went out in the final heat needing only 1 point for a run-off and 2 for the crown. Lying second behind Les Rumsey, he fell on the third lap, remounted, but was too far behind to catch up. Then, Brian Clarke, in third place, fell off in the same spot and Collins went past him for the vital 1 point. With just two riders in the run-off Laurie Etheridge rode across Collins before the first bend and Collins picked himself up from the track and watched from the centre green as Etheridge completed four laps to become champion.

Collins rode the remainder of his career for Berwick Bandits, Glasgow and Edinburgh.

References

1948 births
Living people
British motorcycle racers
British speedway riders
Scottish speedway riders
Berwick Bandits riders
Edinburgh Monarchs riders
Glasgow Tigers riders
Poole Pirates riders
Wembley Lions riders